is a 2021 Japanese historical film directed by Masato Harada. The film was initially scheduled for release in May 2020, but was postponed to October 2021, due to the COVID-19 pandemic.

Plot
Hijikata Toshizō fulfilled his dream of becoming a samurai. As the vice-commander of the Shinsengumi, he works to maintain security in Kyoto. However, finally Japan entered into a Civil War.

Cast
 Main
 Junichi Okada as Hijikata Toshizō
 Ko Shibasaki as Oyuki
 Ryohei Suzuki as Kondō Isami
 Ryosuke Yamada as Okita Sōji
 Hideaki Itō as Serizawa Kamo
 Others

 Onoe Ukon II as Matsudaira Katamori
 Yūki Yamada as Tokugawa Yoshinobu
 Taka Takao as Inoue Genzaburō
 Bandō Minosuke II as Emperor Kōmei
 Junpei Yasui as Yamanami Keisuke
 Ayumi Tanida as Nagakura Shinpachi
 Satoshi Kaneda as Tōdō Heisuke
 Kōhei Matsushita as Saitō Hajime
 Daisuke Muramoto as Yamazaki Susumu
 Kengo Yoshida as Harada Sanosuke
 Nijirō Murakami as Okada Izō
 Junko Abe as Itosato
 Jonas Bloquet as Jules Brunet
 Yasumasa Ōba as Shichiri Kennosuke (fictional character)
 Maki Sakai as Satō Nobu
 Kazuhiro Yamaji as Satō Hikogorō
 Yoshi Sakō as Toshima Kihei
 Yōhei Matsukado as Niimi Nishiki
 Yoshihisa Ishida as Kusaka Genzui
 Yasushi Fuchikami as Katsura Kogorō
 Kiyohiko Shibukawa as Nakajima Nobori
 Magy as Ōsawa Ippei
 Masaki Miura as Miyabe Teizō
 Mitsuo Yoshihara as Itō Kashitarō
 Shintaro Morimoto as Ichimura Tetsunosuke
 Masahiro Takashima as Kiyokawa Hachirō
 Akira Emoto as Marujū Tenshu (fictional character)
 Masachika Ichimura as Honda Kakuan

References

External links

2021 films
2021 drama films
2020s Japanese films
2020s historical drama films
Cultural depictions of Tokugawa Yoshinobu
Films based on Japanese novels
Films directed by Masato Harada
Films postponed due to the COVID-19 pandemic
Films set in Bakumatsu
Films set in Kyoto
Historical action films
2020s Japanese-language films
Jidaigeki films
Samurai films
Toho films